The 2011 French F4 Championship season was the nineteenth season of the series for 1600cc Formula Renault machinery, and the first season to run under the guise of French F4 Championship. The series began on 9 April at Circuit de Lédenon and ended on 30 October at Circuit Paul Ricard, after seven rounds and fourteen races.

Driver lineup

Race calendar and results
All races supported the FFSA GT Championship, except Pau (FIA Formula 3 International Trophy) and Spa-Francorchamps (24 Hours of Spa)

Championship standings
 Points are awarded to the top ten drivers in both races on a 15–12–10–8–6–5–4–3–2–1 basis. Additional points are awarded to the driver achieving pole position and fastest lap in each race. Only a driver's best twelve results count towards the championship.

References

External links
 The official website of the French F4 Championship 

F4 Championship
French F4